Niall Reid-Stephen (born 8 September 2001) is a Bajan international footballer.

Career statistics

Club

Notes

International

References

External links
 
 Niall Reid-Stephen at Caribbean Football Database

2001 births
Living people
Barbadian footballers
Barbados international footballers
Barbados youth international footballers
Association football midfielders
UWI Blackbirds FC players
Sportspeople from Bridgetown
Barbados under-20 international footballers